The Château d'Aguilar (Languedocien: Castèl d’Aguilar) is a 12th-century castle, one of the so-called Cathar castles, located in the commune of Tuchan in the Aude département of France.

Architecture 
The design of the castle is an example of the practical military thinking guiding the 12th century architecture. The castle consists of an inner keep built in the 12th century, surrounded by an outer pentagonal fortification from the 13th century. This fortification is oriented such that its point guards the side most favourable to attackers. The keep and the inner hexagonal fortification is flanked at each corner with semi-circular guard towers, each equipped with archery outlooks. The strategic location of the castle on a hill overhanging the plain of Tuchan allows control and protection of the Corbières Massif. Despite this, the castle is easily accessible from the plains because of its relatively low elevation of 321 metres.

There is a small underground chapel of Saint-Anne below the keep.

History 
The earliest building at this location belonged to the count of Fonnollède since 1021. In the 13th century, the keep that had replaced earlier buildings was bequeathed by the viscounts of Carcassonne to their vassal, the Ternes.

In 1210, it was invaded and occupied by Simon de Montfort, whose soldiers took and held the owner Raymond de Termes in a dark dungeon in the Carcassonne. Militarily, the castle lay dormant for the next 30 years, until Raymond's son Oliver de Termes took back the castle in the brief revolt  against the crusaders. Aguilar became the refuge of many faydits, Cathar knights and lords without strongholds. In 1246, a royal garrison was installed to supervise the Aragon frontier. 

Olivier, however, eventually made an alliance with king Louis IX, who purchased the castle from him in 1260. Despite the heavy fortifications, the castle would be continually under siege by opposers to the French or Spanish rulers until the 16th century.

When the border was pushed back to the south of Roussillon by the treaty of the Pyrenées, the castle gradually lost its strategic importance, and was eventually abandoned in 1659. Today it is in decrepit condition. Since 1949, it has been listed as a monument historique by the French Ministry of Culture.

Pictures

See also 
 List of castles in France

References

External links 

The "Commune de Tuchon" and Aguilar

 The Château de Aguilar on the Cathar Castles page

Buildings and structures completed in the 12th century
Castles in Aude
Ruined castles in Occitania (administrative region)
Monuments historiques of Aude
Catharism